The REALTORS Association of Hamilton-Burlington (RAHB) is the 3rd largest  real estate board  in Ontario and the 8th largest in Canada, representing over 2900 members in Hamilton, Burlington and surrounding areas.  

In the community, RAHB is the largest fundraiser to the CHML/Y108 Children's Fund, a founding member of the Home Ownership Affordability Partnership (in conjunction with the City of Hamilton and the Threshold School of Building), and administrator of the Karan Barker Memorial Scholarship.  In November 2006, RAHB grabbed national headlines for its pledge to send Tim Hortons gift certificates to Canadian troops stationed in Kandahar, Afghanistan.

Officially founded in 1921, the REALTORS Association of Hamilton-Burlington was previously:
 the Hamilton Real Estate Board
 the Metropolitan Hamilton Real Estate Board
 the Hamilton-Burlington District Real Estate Board

The Association's landmark building on York Boulevard, was acquired in 1990 for $3.8M.

History
 1874 - Hamilton Real Estate Association formed - a precursor to organized real estate in Hamilton
 1921 - Hamilton Real Estate Board founded
 1949 - first real estate group in Ontario to introduce the Multiple Listing Service
 1951 - first Photo Co-op System (predecessor to modern day MLS) in Canada

See also
 Canadian Real Estate Association
 Ontario Real Estate Association

External links
 REALTORS Association of Hamilton-Burlington

References

Real estate industry trade groups
Organizations based in Hamilton, Ontario
1874 establishments in Canada